The 2000 Men's World Outdoor Bowls Championship  was held at Marks Park Bowling Club, in Johannesburg, South Africa, from 1 to 15 April 2000. The 2000 Women's World Outdoor Bowls Championship was held at Moama Bowling Club in Moama, Australia from 8 to 25 March 2000.

Medallists

Results

W.M.Leonard Trophy 

+ Scotland won bronze on shots 370.20 to 248.40

Taylor Trophy

References

 
World Outdoor Bowls Championship
2000 in South African sport
World Outdoor Bowls Championship
Bowls in South Africa
Sport in Johannesburg
April 2000 sports events in Africa